Marlin Edgar Olmsted (May 21, 1847 – July 19, 1913) was a Republican member of the U.S. House of Representatives from Pennsylvania.

Marlin E. Olmsted was born near Ulysses, Pennsylvania.  He attended the common schools and Coudersport Academy.  He was the assistant corporation clerk and promoted to corporation clerk in charge of collection of corporate taxes under Pennsylvania’s revenue system.  He studied law, was admitted to the bar in 1878, and commenced practice in Harrisburg, Pennsylvania.  He was elected to represent Dauphin County, Pennsylvania, in the proposed constitutional convention in 1891.

Olmsted was elected as a Republican to the Fifty-fifth and to the seven succeeding Congresses.  He served as Chairman of the United States House Committee on Elections No. 2, during the Fifty-seventh through Sixtieth Congresses, and the United States House Committee on Insular Affairs, during the Sixty-first Congress.  He was one of the managers appointed by the United States House of Representatives in 1905 to conduct the impeachment proceedings against Charles Swayne, judge of the United States District Court for the Northern District of Florida.  He was not a candidate for renomination in 1912.  He resumed the practice of his profession in Harrisburg.  He died in New York City in 1913.  Interment in the Harrisburg Cemetery.

Sources

The Political Graveyard

External links

1847 births
1913 deaths
Burials at Harrisburg Cemetery
Politicians from Harrisburg, Pennsylvania
Pennsylvania lawyers
19th-century American railroad executives
Republican Party members of the United States House of Representatives from Pennsylvania
19th-century American politicians
19th-century American lawyers